Chakapuli is a Georgian stew. It is considered to be one of the most popular dishes in Georgia.

Preparation 
It is made from lamb chops or veal, onions, tarragon leaves, cherry plums or tkemali (cherry plum sauce), dry white wine, mixed fresh herbs (parsley, mint, dill, coriander), garlic and salt. Chakapuli can also be made with beef or mushrooms instead of lamb.

Chopped lamb is boiled with white wine in deep pan and then the pan is placed in the oven and cooked slowly for 1.5 hours. After this process, the tkemali sauce is stirred into the lamb and the chopped greens and garlic are added. The dish is then cooked for another 5 minutes in the oven and is finally rested for 5 minutes before serving.

See also
 Chanakhi
 Chakhokhbili
 Khoresh
 List of lamb dishes
 List of plum dishes
 Piti

References

Stews
Cuisine of Georgia (country)
Soviet cuisine